The Asia-Pacific International Baseball Training Centers is a baseball training complex in Tainan, Taiwan. The complex consists of two standard stadiums, two U-12 stadiums, two infield training fields, six pitchers/batters outdoor training fields and one indoor training facility.

History

In 2016, the city of Tainan announced plans for the training complex in a bid to turn Tainan into a spring training base for professional baseball teams both within Taiwan and abroad. Construction of the complex is split into two phases, with phase 1 focusing on the U-12 stadiums and phase 2 on the standard stadiums and other training facilities. Phase 1 was completed in July, 2019 and just in time to host the 2019 U-12 Baseball World Cup, while phase 2 is slated for completion by end of 2023 to be inaugurated in CPBL's 2024 season. The Tainan-based Uni-President 7-Eleven Lions has expressed interests in moving to the new stadium once it is completed.

See also
 List of stadiums in Taiwan
 Sport in Taiwan

References

Baseball venues in Taiwan
Buildings and structures in Tainan